Dad Dáger (born August 12, 1967, Caracas, Distrito Capital, Venezuela) is a Venezuelan actress. She is known for her roles in telenovelas of Telemundo and RCTV.

Filmography 

2018

Personal life 
Dad Dáger has a son, who was born in 2010.

References

External links

Actresses from Caracas
20th-century Venezuelan actresses
21st-century Venezuelan actresses
Venezuelan telenovela actresses
1967 births
Living people